Hoploscopa mediobrunnea is a moth in the family Crambidae. It is found in Vietnam.

References

Moths described in 1929
Hoploscopini